Adam E. Namm (born 1963) was appointed the Executive Secretary of the Inter-American Drug Abuse Control Commission (CICAD) of the Organization of American States (OAS) on December 1, 2016, following a 30-year career in the U.S. diplomatic service, including serving as U.S. Ambassador to Ecuador from 2012 to 2015.

Education and early career
A native of White Plains, New York, Namm graduated from Phillips Academy (high school) in 1981, holds an A.B. magna cum laude in International Relations from Brown University, and an M.S. in National Security Strategy from the National War College.  He spent his junior year of college studying in Paris, France with IES Abroad.  He speaks Spanish and French. Before entering the U.S. Foreign Service, Namm worked as a marketing consultant in the field of fiberoptics.

Diplomatic career
Namm entered the U.S. Foreign Service in 1987 and served tours in Santo Domingo, Dominican Republic, Dhahran, Saudi Arabia, Bogota, Colombia, and Islamabad, Pakistan, as well as in various domestic assignments. As the Director of OBO in Washington, D.C., he managed an annual budget of more than $2 billion and oversaw the opening of 24 U.S. diplomatic facilities.

He was nominated to be U.S. Ambassador to Ecuador by Barack Obama on September 6, 2011, and confirmed by the Senate on April 26, 2012.  He arrived in Quito on May 30, 2012, and concluded his tenure as ambassador on September 30, 2015.

Organization of American States (OAS)
Namm was appointed Executive Secretary of the Organization of American States Inter-American Drug Abuse Control Commission Inter-American Drug Abuse Control Commission(known by its Spanish language acronym, CICAD) on December 1, 2016.  CICAD is the Western Hemisphere's policy forum for dealing with the drug problem. The CICAD Executive Secretariat supports the commission by strengthening the human and institutional capabilities and channeling the collective efforts of its member states to reduce the production, trafficking, and use of illegal drugs. The Hemispheric Drug Strategy , approved in May 2010, expresses the firm commitment of OAS member states to deal with the consequences of the drug trade, which pose a growing threat to health, economic development, social cohesion, and the rule of law.

References

1963 births
Ambassadors of the United States to Ecuador
Phillips Academy alumni
Brown University alumni
Living people
National War College alumni
People from White Plains, New York
United States Department of State officials